Otiški Vrh (in older sources also Otišni vrh) is a dispersed settlement in the hills southeast of Dravograd in the Styria region in northern Slovenia.

Geography

The Mislinja River joins the Meža River from the right north of the village of Otiški Vrh, only a couple of hundred meters before the Meža joins the Drava River.

History
In 2004, the settlement of Bukovje was administratively separated from Otiški Vrh.

Mass grave
Otiški Vrh is the site of a mass grave associated with the Second World War. It contains the remains of unidentified victims.

Church
The parish church in the settlement is a pilgrimage church dedicated to Saint Peter. It is built on a hill known as Kronska gora, high above the Mislinja Valley. It is a Baroque building with a two-storey entrance facade and a double belfry built between 1745 and 1750. A second church to the east of the settlement is dedicated to Saint Oswald. It is a Late Gothic church with 17th-century wall paintings.

References

External links
Otiški Vrh on Geopedia

Populated places in the Municipality of Dravograd